Auburn is a city in Sangamon County, Illinois, United States. The population was 4,771 at the 2010 census, and 4,681 in 2018. It is part of the Springfield, Illinois Metropolitan Statistical Area.

Geography

Demographics

At the 2000 census there were 4,317 people in 1,618 households, including 1,187 families, in the city. The racial makeup of the city was 98.36% White, 0.30% African American, 0.16% Native American, 0.28% Asian, 0.30% from other races, and 0.60% from two or more races. Hispanic or Latino of any race were 0.76%.

Of the 1,618 households 42.0% had children under the age of 18 living with them, 56.6% were married couples living together, 13.2% had a female householder with no husband present, and 26.6% were non-families. 22.9% of households were one person and 9.7% were one person aged 65 or older. The average household size was 2.63 and the average family size was 3.09.

The age distribution was 30.4% under the age of 18, 7.5% from 18 to 24, 33.1% from 25 to 44, 17.5% from 45 to 64, and 11.5% 65 or older. The median age was 33 years. For every 100 females, there were 88.2 males. For every 100 females age 18 and over, there were 82.4 males.

The median household income was $43,250 and the median family income  was $49,200. Males had a median income of $34,339 versus $24,167 for females. The per capita income for the city was $18,368. About 4.8% of families and 5.5% of the population were below the poverty line, including 8.0% of those under age 18 and 4.5% of those age 65 or over.

Notable people
 Dutch Leonard, MLB pitcher for 20 years, was born in Auburn.

References

Cities in Illinois
Cities in Sangamon County, Illinois
Cities in Springfield metropolitan area, Illinois